Max Wright (born ) is an English rugby union player who plays in the centre for Newcastle Falcons on loan from Bath Rugby.

Max Wright was a student at Silcoates School in Wakefield. 

Wright joined Bath from Yorkshire Carnegie in October 2017 having scored two tries in twelve appearances for the Yorkshiremen in the 2016-17 season. Wright had to wait a year for his Bath debut after suffering an ankle injury which required three surgeries. He made his debut in September 2018 in the Premiership in a 17-15 victory over Northampton Saints. He joined Newcastle Falcons on short-term loan in late September 2021.

International career
Wright played as England won the Six Nations Under 20s Championship Grand Slam in 2017.

References

Living people
1997 births
English rugby union players
Bath Rugby players